North West Durham is a constituency represented in the House of Commons of the UK Parliament since 12 December 2019 by Richard Holden of the Conservative Party.

Constituency profile 
The constituency is in the north west of County Durham, in the North East England region. It currently consists of the western part of the former Derwentside district (including Consett and Lanchester) and the northern part of the former Wear Valley district (including Weardale, Crook and Willington).

The majority of the electorate live in former mining or steel towns, where Labour traditionally have polled higher than other parties, with the remainder in rural farms and villages throughout valleys cleft from the eastern, rocky part of the Pennines.

History

1885–1918 
The constituency was first created for the 1885 general election by the Redistribution of Seats Act 1885 as one of eight new single-member divisions of the county of Durham, replacing the two 2-member seats of North Durham and South Durham. It was centred on two main communities, Consett and Lanchester.

It was abolished in 1918 with the creation of Consett as a separate constituency. Lanchester was transferred to an enlarged Barnard Castle seat and Tanfield was added to the new constituency of Blaydon.

1950–present 
On its recreation under the Representation of the People Act 1948, North-West Durham absorbed the abolished Spennymoor seat, with the exception of the town of Spennymoor itself (which was added in 1974). It also regained Lanchester, together with Weardale, from the now abolished Barnard Castle.

As a result of the periodic review of parliamentary constituencies following the re-organisation of local government under the Local Government Act 1972, the seat underwent a major redistribution for the 1983 general election: the town of Consett was regained from the abolished constituency thereof, and Brandon and Spennymoor were transferred to City of Durham and Sedgefield respectively. The boundaries were now similar to the first version of the constituency.

Boundaries

1885-1918 

 The Sessional Division of Lanchester and Consett; and
 the Parishes of Edmondbyers and Hunstanworth 
See map on Vision of Britain website. (NB Boundary Commission proposed name was "Lanchester")

1950–1974 

 The Urban Districts of Brandon and Byshottles, Crook and Willington, and Tow Law; and
 the Rural Districts of Lanchester and Weardale.

1974–1983 

 The Urban Districts of Brandon and Byshottles, Crook and Willington, Spennymoor, and Tow Law;
 the Rural Districts of Lanchester and Weardale; and
 the parish of Brancepeth in the Rural District of Durham.

Spennymoor transferred from Durham with the parish of Brancepeth.

1983–1997 

 The District of Derwentside wards of Benfieldside, Blackhill, Burnhope, Castleside, Consett North, Consett South, Cornsay, Crookhall, Delves Lane, Ebchester and Medomsley, Esh, Lanchester, and Leadgate; and
 the District of Wear Valley wards of Crook North, Crook South, Howden, Hunwick, St John's Chapel, Stanhope, Stanley, Tow Law, Wheatbottom and Helmington Row, Willington East, Willington West, and Wolsingham.

Gained area comprising former urban district of Consett (incorporating Benfieldside, Consett and Leadgate). Brandon and Byshottles, and Brancepeth transferred to City of Durham, and Spennymoor to Sedgefield.

1997–2010 

 The District of Derwentside wards of Benfieldside, Blackhill, Burnhope, Burnopfield, Castleside, Consett North, Consett South, Cornsay, Crookhall, Delves Lane, Dipton, Ebchester and Medomsley, Esh, Lanchester, and Leadgate; and
 the District of Wear Valley wards of Crook North, Crook South, Howden, Hunwick, St John's Chapel, Stanhope, Stanley, Tow Law, Wheatbottom and Helmington Row, Willington East, Willington West, and Wolsingham.

The Derwentside District wards of Burnopfield and Dipton transferred from North Durham.

2010–present 

 The District of Derwentside wards of Benfieldside, Blackhill, Burnhope, Burnopfield, Castleside, Consett East, Consett North, Consett South, Cornsay, Delves Lane, Dipton, Ebchester and Medomsley, Esh, Lanchester, and Leadgate; and
 the District of Wear Valley wards of Crook North, Crook South, Howden, Hunwick, St John's Chapel, Stanhope, Tow Law and Stanley, Wheatbottom and Helmington Row, Willington Central, Willington West End, Wolsingham, and Witton-le-Wear.

The 1997 boundaries were retained despite the official description of the constituency changing slightly in terms of the names of the local authority wards.

In the 2009 structural changes to local government in England, the local authority districts in Durham were abolished and replaced with a single unitary authority; however, this has not affected the boundaries of the constituency.

Political history

1885–1918 
During the first creation, Liberals represented the area and the first member until 1914 was the son of a prominent Chartist, Ernest Jones, who helped to promote New Liberalism, encouraging the Liberal Party to take on instead the politics of "mass working-class" appeal. This politics was epitomised by David Lloyd George whose People's Budget in 1909 led to the supremacy of the House of Commons over the House of Lords in 1911, national pensions under a basic welfare state (but without a National Health Service).

1950–present 
From its recreation in 1950 until December 2019, the seat had been represented in Westminster by members of the Labour Party. For many years the area gave large majorities suggesting a safe seat for Labour.

Both the future Conservative Party leader and Prime Minister, Theresa May, and the future Liberal Democrat leader, Tim Farron, were candidates for their respective parties at this seat for the 1992 general election, which both of them lost to incumbent Labour MP Hilary Armstrong.

In 2016 the incumbent MP, Pat Glass, announced her intention to step down at the 2017 general election in the wake of the Brexit referendum. Her successor Laura Pidcock, a close supporter of party leader Jeremy Corbyn, lost the seat in the 2019 general election to the current MP, Richard Holden, as part of the Conservative Party's strategy to target seats in the so-called red wall.

Members of Parliament

MPs 1885–1918

MPs since 1950

Elections

Elections in the 2010s 
#

Elections in the 2000s

Elections in the 1990s 

:

Elections in the 1980s

Elections in the 1970s

Elections in the 1960s

Elections in the 1950s

Elections in the 1910s

Elections in the 1900s

Elections in the 1890s

Elections in the 1880s

See also
List of parliamentary constituencies in County Durham
History of parliamentary constituencies and boundaries in Durham

Notes

References

Parliamentary constituencies in County Durham
Constituencies of the Parliament of the United Kingdom established in 1885
Constituencies of the Parliament of the United Kingdom disestablished in 1918
Constituencies of the Parliament of the United Kingdom established in 1950